Shakhmelu (also Romanized as Shakhmelū; also known as Sheykhlū) is a village in Mulan Rural District, in the Central District of Kaleybar County, East Azerbaijan Province, Iran. At the 2006 census, its population was 48, in 10 families.

References 

Populated places in Kaleybar County